Project Handclasp is a humanitarian program of the United States Navy, started in 1962, that distributes materials and medical help. It serves as a public relations program for U.S. Navy personnel in foreign countries and more broadly as a counterinsurgency organization; all branches of the U.S. military have a "civic action" program for this purpose.

History
Since 1962, during the Vietnam War, Project Handclasp has been a formal U.S. Navy program that coordinates the transportation and delivery of humanitarian and educational items to foreign countries on a space available basis. It succeeded an earlier program, called "Operation Handclasp", that in the 1950s had the explicit purpose of waging the Cold War by humanitarian means. Starting 1963, the program sent medical teams, food and various other supplies to Vietnam, becoming part of a "politicization of medicine" that by 1966 had become an outright pro-South Vietnam propaganda operation.

In collaboration with the Project Handclasp Foundation, Inc., U.S. embassies, American
charities and foreign organizations, the U.S. Navy provides free transportation and storage of donated materials from various American charities to countries that have asked for assistance. U.S. embassies, or U.S. country teams, coordinate with the host country about the relief work and materials to be provided ensuring that
the help given is truly useful to the host country. The actual items are delivered directly by U.S. Sailors and Marines, giving them a chance to interact with the local people, building relationships and strengthening trust between the United States and the host nations. Notable among such charities was Pat Robertson's Operation Blessing, which used the program for the additional purpose of "keep[ing] them [U.S. sailors] out of the bars". Relations with evangelical charities in fact date back to 1959, when the predecessor Operation Handclasp shipped goods for World Vision.

The primary purpose of Project Handclasp is to receive, collect, consolidate and store humanitarian, educational, and goodwill material for transportation on naval vessels and distribution by U.S. Navy and Marine Corps personnel on behalf of American citizens to needy people overseas. As a secondary purpose, Project Handclasp may accept and arrange space- available transportation of consigned material from organizations or individuals who desire transportation to specified recipient organizations overseas. The types of material considered appropriate for distribution through Project Handclasp include: 
Material to supplement basic necessities; e.g., food, clothing, treadle sewing machines and accessories, medical equipment and supplies, hygienic items, hand tools, and light building material. 
Educational material; e.g., textbooks, library books, magazines, school supplies, learning aids, and audiovisual items.
Recreational material for children; e.g., toys, athletic equipment, and playground equipment. 
Overseas port visit mementos: e.g., souvenirs and mementos of shipboard visits.

Project Handclasp Foundation
Project Handclasp Foundation, Inc., San Diego, California (USA), supports Project Handclasp by taking legal title to all donations intended for distribution to needy people by Project Handclasp. Donations collected by Project Handclasp do not become property of the U.S. Navy, but are transported and distributed to needy people per this instruction. The Foundation provides the appropriate vehicle for accepting donations from the private sector. The Foundation supports the objectives and functions of Director, Project Handclasp, who is the Navy official responsible for this Chief of Naval Operations (CNO) enterprise.

See also

 Soft power

References

External links
U.S. Navy Project Handclasp Command website
Project Handclasp Foundation

Handclasp